Christina Maria Pushaw is an American political aide, serving as rapid response director for the 2022 re-election campaign of Ron DeSantis. She is a member of the Republican Party.

Career 
Pushaw was raised in Malibu, California. She graduated from University of Southern California (USC) in 2012 and earned a master's degree in international relations from Johns Hopkins University in 2017.

In 2008, Pushaw developed an interest in Georgia in the Transcaucasus, after hearing presidential candidate John McCain speak about it. She visited the country for the first time after graduating from USC. Pushaw established the New Leaders Initiative, a non-governmental organization (NGO) that hosted events for Georgians interested in "democracy and international affairs".

From June 2017 to July 2019, Pushaw worked in Washington, D.C. for the Stand Together organization. She worked for former Georgia president Mikheil Saakashvili from 2018 to 2020, living in the capital, Tbilisi. In June 2022, Pushaw retroactively registered as a foreign agent per the Foreign Agents Registration Act, after the United States Department of Justice contacted her.

From May 2021 until August 2022, Pushaw worked as the press secretary for Florida Governor Ron DeSantis, before leaving to join his campaign team as rapid response director.

Pushaw was suspended by Twitter following her "tweeting" in 2021 concerning an Associated Press report. Pushaw recommended that followers “drag them" and as DeSantis' press secretary, said she would put the A.P. reporter “on blast.” The A.P. said Pushaw had made “a direct effort to activate an online mob to attack a journalist." But Pushaw said she believed she had not incited the violent threats made to the A.P. which followed her tweet.

References 

Living people
American political women
American press secretaries
University of Southern California alumni
Johns Hopkins University alumni
Year of birth missing (living people)
People from Malibu, California
Florida Republicans